Mazi may refer to:

 Mazı Underground City
 Suzhou numerals
 GOC Army Headquarters
 Mazi (Islam), a term in Islamic jurisprudence
 Mazi Melesa Pilip, Ethiopian-born American politician